Wesley Adam Hampton (born December 8, 1977) is a Christian music singer. He is a tenor for The Gaither Vocal Band. Hampton sang first tenor for the group from 2005 to 2009, then when it went from a quartet to a quintet, he became the second tenor. He also performs solo concerts. His first solo album was titled "A Man Like Me." Wes also appears and performs in the Gaither Homecoming video concert series, television series and cruises.

Early life
Hampton was born in Memphis, Tennessee. He studied at Trevecca Nazarene University from 1996 to 1998, and he then went on to receive a B.A. in psychology and a minor in music from the University of Alabama at Birmingham, in 2000. He was part of the worship staff at The Church at Brook Hills, a Birmingham church, for seven years.

Career
Hampton was the tenor for The Trevedores, a Christian music singing group affiliated with Trevecca Nazarene University from 1996 through 1998. In 2005, after family members passed his demo tape around to friends of Bill Gaither, Wes auditioned to replace David Phelps as the tenor of the group. After 7 weeks of auditions Wes joined The Gaither Vocal Band. Wes also appears in the Gaither Homecoming video series.

Other works
Hampton released a cookbook in 2009 called, A Place at the Table. In 2016, he released a second cookbook, WEScipes. In 2021, he released a third cookbook, WEScipes 2.0.

Personal life
Hampton is married to Andrea (Means), and they have four boys, Barrett, Hudson, Carden, and Sutton.

Discography

Solo

Gaither Vocal Band

Compilations
Some contain additional new material or alternate versions of the original albums.

2013: Icon (Spring House/Universal Music)
2015: Christmas Collection (Gaither Music Group)
2016: The Ultimate Playlist (Gaither Music Group) – available online only

Homecoming Series

Awards and nominations

Grammy Awards

GMA Dove Awards

Singing News Awards
2006 Singing News Horizon Individual Fan Award.

References

External links
 
 Gaither Vocal Band Profile
 The Grammy Award Profile

1977 births
American gospel singers
Living people
Southern gospel performers
Grammy Award winners
21st-century American singers
21st-century Christians
Trevecca Nazarene University alumni
Singers from Tennessee
People from Memphis, Tennessee
21st-century American male singers